Ibrahim ben Ali or after baptism Ibraham Adam Ben Ali (1756–1800), was an Ottoman-Turkish soldier and physician who first drew notice as a convert-friend of the Dublin Methodist theologian Adam Clarke, and after spending time with the minister there and in England, he emigrated to the United States.

Early life
Ibrahim ben Ali was born in Istanbul, Ottoman Turkey, in 1756, the son of Ali ben Mustapha, a Muslim with an estate 6 miles from the city, and Halima, a Greek Christian slave from Zante who was captured by Venetians and bought by Mustapha in Aleppo. Ben Ali was raised a Muslim but also received an introduction to Christianity from his mother, and from several Spanish slaves owned by the family. When Ibrahim ben Ali was thirteen, he married his wife Halima, who was twelve at the time. In that same year he made the Hajj to Mecca, subsequently taking two additional wives named Fatima and Ayesha, and eventually fathering 6 children by the three.

With this expanding family, a commission as captain in the Janissaries was obtained for Ibrahim by his father. About five years into this service he was wrongfully arrested and condemned to death for the murder of two officers with whom he was acquainted. On the eve of his execution, an old Spanish slave encouraged him to convert to Christianity before his death, thereby reinforcing the teachings Ibrahim had from his mother. His exoneration the next morning convinced him to pursue Christianity, and he purchased and freed the slave, keeping him in his household to provide religious instruction. He also served in the army as a doctor. In the fourth battle he fought against the Russians during the Russo-Turkish war he was captured in Wallachia and made prisoner at Arzenicour, in Russia. While in captivity, fellow prisoners wrote to Constantinople accusing him of apostasy and treason, causing his parents, wives and children to leave the city for Izmail, where they were all killed when the Russians sacked the outpost.  Ibrahim was eventually freed after two years, following the intervention of either a local woman or Russian princess whose vision he had helped to recover, or of a British general, but having been warned of the danger of returning home by his brother, he instead took ship for Copenhagen and Liverpool, and thence to Dublin.

Later life
Arriving in the Irish city in 1791 speaking little English but fluent in Arabic and Spanish, he was introduced to the Rev. Adam Clarke and received religious instruction from him on a daily basis. He was baptized as 'Adam' in a ceremony translated for him into Spanish by Clarke.  He later accompanied Clarke on his ministries to Liverpool and after two years there, to Manchester, remaining there for "some considerable time". He also spent time in Greenock, Glasgow and Edinburgh, before emigrating to the United States.

In America as Mr. Ibraham Adam Ben Ali, he set up practice as a physician in Boston, where he advertised patent medicines in late 1794, followed by stints in New York City from 1795, Philadelphia in 1799, and Baltimore in 1800. He married a Baptist Englishwoman, having by her a sole daughter, Adeline, who became wife of Terah Temple Haggin and mother of multi-millionaire lawyer and investor James Ben Ali Haggin (1822–1914).  In 1800, he died at or near Baltimore of the yellow fever outbreak that hit that city and Philadelphia, having contracted the disease while treating those infected.

See also
Marie Tepe, 19th-century settler to the US of Turkish origin

References

1756 births
1800 deaths
18th-century American physicians
American people of Turkish descent
Emigrants from the Ottoman Empire to the United States